Fred Dow Fagg III (February 27, 1934 – April 19, 2002) was the ninth dean of the Northwestern School of Law at Lewis & Clark, now Lewis and Clark Law School, in Portland, Oregon.  Fagg, the son of former President of the University of Southern California Fred D. Fagg, Jr., joined the law school in 1970 and served as dean from 1973 to 1982.  While he was Dean, the law school gained full accreditation by the American Bar Association and the Association of American Law Schools.  As a professor of law, Fagg taught Antitrust.

Fagg died of melanoma on April 19, 2002.  A study room in Wood Hall at Lewis & Clark law school is dedicated to "Fred D. Fagg."

Fagg received his bachelor's degree from the University of Southern California in 1956.  He received an MBA from Harvard Business School in 1960 and a JD from the University of Michigan Law School in 1963.  He then practiced antitrust law with Overton, Lyman and Prince.

In 1967 Fagg married Judith Ann Carlisle.  They had one daughter, Catherine L. Carlisle.

References
L&C Chronicle
Trojan Family Magazine

Notes

1934 births
2002 deaths
Deans of law schools in the United States
University of Southern California alumni
Harvard Business School alumni
University of Michigan Law School alumni
Lawyers from Portland, Oregon
Lewis & Clark College faculty
United States Navy officers
20th-century American lawyers
20th-century American academics